Emirler is a  village in Gölbaşı district of Ankara Province, Turkey. Distance to Ankara is  .The village is situated at the west of the Turkish state highway . There is a short wave radio transmitter of Voice of Turkey in 5 km West of the village. The population of Emirler is 422  as of 2011. The residents are of Turkmen origin.

References

Villages in Gölbaşı District, Ankara Province